Shoesmith is a surname, referring to a maker of horseshoes (not a cobbler). Notable people with the surname include:

Gavin Shoesmith, Australian singer, songwriter, double bassist and bass guitarist
George Shoesmith, was an English cricketer
Joseph Shoesmith, was an English cricketer
Rod Shoesmith, Australian rugby league footballer

English-language surnames
Occupational surnames
English-language occupational surnames